Muhibbah LRT station is a Light Rapid Transit station at Kampung Muhibbah, a village about 21 km south of Kuala Lumpur, the capital of Malaysia.

Muhibbah station is the nearest station for PPR Kampung Muhibbah and Parklane OUG Service Apartments, although it is a 1.0 km walking distance thru PPR Kampung Muhibbah Block D. It is possible to walk from Muhibbah station to the next station, which is Awan Besar LRT station.

It is operated under the Sri Petaling Line. Like most other LRT stations operating in Klang Valley, this station is elevated.

Design and layout

Bus Services 
{| class="wikitable"
!Route
No.
!Operator
!Origin
!Destination
!Via
!Frequency
(Minutes)
!Operating
Hours
|-
|651
|Rapid KL 
|Muhibbah LRT Station
|Pearl Point
|Awan Besar
|20
|6.30 AM to 11.30 PM

References

External links 
Muhibbah LRT Station - KL MRT / LRT Integration
 https://goo.gl/maps/G7gThG5pJPv - Google Maps

Ampang Line
Railway stations opened in 2015